Abraham of Armenia may refer to:

Abraham of Arazd, 5th century Armenian Christian priest, hermit, and saint. Tortured but survived the martyrdom of other Leontine martyrs
Abraham I of Armenia, Armenian catholicos in the Dvin era of the Armenian Apostolic Church between 607 and 615 
Abraham II of Armenia or Abraham Khoshabetzi, Catholicos of the Armenian Apostolic Church between 1730 and 1734.
Abraham III of Armenia or Abraham of Crete or Abraham Kretatsi (d. 1737), Catholicos of the Armenian Apostolic Church between 1734 and 1737